Clifton is the name of some places in the U.S. state of Wisconsin:

Clifton, Grant County, Wisconsin, a town
Clifton, Monroe County, Wisconsin, a town
Clifton, Pierce County, Wisconsin, a town
Clifton (community), Wisconsin, an unincorporated community